Charles William Froessel (November 8, 1892 in Brooklyn, Kings County, New York – May 2, 1982 in Manhattan, New York City) was an American lawyer and politician.

Early life
He was the son of Theodore Froessel and Barbara Froessel. He graduated LL.B. in 1913, and LL.M. in 1914, from New York Law School. During World War I he served in the U.S. Navy with the rank of lieutenant.

Career 
He was Counsel to the Sheriff of Queens County from 1916 to 1920. He was Assistant District Attorney of Queens County from 1924 to 1930. On June 1, 1927, he married Elsie Stier (d. 1952). He was Special Assistant to the U.S. Attorney General in charge of slum clearance projects in New York City from 1935 to 1937.

In January 1937, he was appointed a justice of the City Court in Queens County. In November 1937, he was elected to the New York Supreme Court (2nd District).

An active Freemason, Froessel served as Grand Master of Masons in the State of New York for two terms, 1944 and 1945.

In 1949, he ran on the Democratic and Liberal tickets to the New York Court of Appeals and was elected. In 1951 he wrote a concurring opinion on school prayer, arguing that non-sectarian school prayer was constitutional, whereas daily school prayer was un-constitutional.

He retired from the bench at the end of 1962 when he reached the constitutional age limit of 70 years.

Retirement and later life 
In retirement, Froessel served on the board of trustees and as a dean at New York Law School.

He died on May 2, 1982 at St. Vincent's Hospital (Manhattan).

Sources

The History of the New York Court of Appeals, 1932-2003 by Bernard S. Meyer, Burton C. Agata & Seth H. Agata (page 23)
 Court of Appeals judges
MRS. CHARLES FROESSEL His wife's obit in NYT on March 17, 1952 (subscription required)

Judges of the New York Court of Appeals
1892 births
1982 deaths
American people of Dutch descent
Lawyers from New York City
Military personnel from New York City
People from Queens, New York
People from Brooklyn
New York Supreme Court Justices
New York Law School alumni
United States Navy officers
20th-century American judges
20th-century American lawyers